List & Label is a professional reporting tool for software developers. It provides comprehensive design, print and export functions. The software component runs on Microsoft Windows and can be implemented in desktop, cloud and web applications. List & Label can be used to create user-defined dashboards, lists, invoices, forms and labels. It supports many development environments, frameworks and programming languages such as Microsoft Visual Studio, Embarcadero RAD Studio, .NET Framework, .NET Core, ASP.NET, C++, Delphi, Java, C Sharp and some more.
List & Label either retrieves data from various sources via data binding, or works database independent. Reports are designed and created in the so-called List & Label Designer and then exported into a multitude of formats like PDF, Excel, XHTML and RTF. Since version 27 a web report designer for ASP.NET MVC is available.

History
The current version is 28. A new major version of List & Label is released every fall, usually in October. Updates are available several times a year via Service Pack.

Features

Report Designer
The Designer enables users to graphically layout the report. It offers report objects such as tables, charts, crosstabs, gauges, HTML, conditionally formatted text, barcodes, matrix codes, and graphics, and is extensible using third-party add-ons. User applications can interact with the report via the programmable object model of the report. An HTML5 viewer is also available.

Web Report Designer
The web report designer works browser-based and independent from printer drivers and spoolers - that makes deployments to the cloud easier. Just like the use of the Visual Studio deployment pipeline.

Data Sources
Depending on the programming language, the product offers automatic support for data sources:
 Databases such as Microsoft SQL Server, Oracle, MySQL, PostgreSQL, IBM Db2, SQLite, MariaDB, MongoDB, Cosmos DB
 XML data, CSV
 Business objects
 Data sources that can be accessed via OLE DB, ODBC or ADO.NET
 LINQ data and data from web services
 GraphQL

Additionally, the product offers support for unbound data and can be extended to support other data sources via interfaces.

Output Options
Printer
Image Formats (JPEG, BMP, EMF, TIFF, PNG, SVG, HEIF, WebP)
Document Formats: PDF, PDF/A, Word (DOCX), Excel (XLS), PowerPoint (PPTX)
HTML, XHTML, MHTML
Barcodes
Plain Text, RTF, CSV, JSON
XML, ZIP, Email, JSON
List & Label preview file

Target Audience
List & Label can be used in Windows development environments. While it competes most notably on the Microsoft .NET platform with other products such as Crystal Reports, SQL Server Reporting Services, ActiveReports, there are few competing products for other programming languages (e.g. Progress, Alaska Xbase++, Visual DataFlex).

Awards
Reader's Choice Award 2005–2008
Stevie Awards 2021: Best Technology for Data Visualization
Top 100 Publisher Award Component Source 2013-2014, 2014-2015,2016, 2018, 2019, 2020, 2021, 2022

References

External links
 

Business intelligence software
Reporting software
Programming tools